Events from the 6th century in Ireland.

500s
506
 23 March - Death of Bishop Mac Cairthinn of Clogher.

507
 Death of Lugaid mac Lóegairi, High King of Ireland.
 3 September - Death of St. Mac Nisi, Bishop of Connor (according to some sources, see 509 below).

509
 3 September - Death of St. Mac Nisi, Bishop of Connor (according to some sources; see 507 above).

510s
512
 29 June - A solar eclipse is recorded.
 2 November - Death of Bishop Erc of Slane (according to some sources; see 513 below).

513
 2 November - Death of Bishop Erc of Slane (according to some sources; see 512 above).

515
 Birth of Abbot Cainnech of Aghaboe at Glengiven near Dungiven in Ulster (according to some sources; see 516 below).

516
 Battle of Druim Derge in Leinster; the Laigin finally lose the Irish Midlands to the Uí Néill.
 Birth of Bishop Ciarán of Clonmacnoise ("Ciarán the Younger"), one of the Twelve Apostles of Ireland.
 Birth of Abbot Cainnech of Aghaboe at Glengiven near Dungiven in Ulster (according to some sources; see 515 above).

517–518
 6 July - Death of St. Moninne (Darercae) at the convent she established at Killeavy (year varies according to sources).

520s
520
 Monastery founded in Ballyleague by St. Faithleach of Clontuskert (brother of Brendan).
 Clonard Abbey in modern County Meath founded by St. Finnian of Clonard.
3 May - Death of Conleth, Bishop of Kildare (in 516 according to some sources).
(approximate year) - Clane Friary founded by Ailbe of Emly

521
7 December - Birth of Columba (Colm Cille or Columcille) in Gartan, missionary monk (died 597).
7 December - Death of St. Búite of Monasterboice.

522
 Death of Eochaid mac Óengusa, an Eoganachta king of Munster. His son Crimthann Srem mac Echado succeeds him.

523 
 St. Ninnidh made the island of Inishmacsaint (island of plain Sorrell) in Lough Erne his headquarters around 523.

523–526
 1 February - Death of St. Brigit of Kildare (year varies according to sources) (born c.451).

527
 Death of Illan mac Dúnlainge, King of Leinster.

527–528
 12 September or 30 December - Death of Bishop Ailbe of Emly (year varies according to sources; also given as 534 or 542).

530s

530
Brendan completes building of monastic cells at Ardfert
Monastic settlements are established on Lambay Island and at Clonmore, County Carlow.
Birth of Dallán Forgaill, Ollamh Érenn, on Magh Slécht.
Birth of Saint Moluag in Dál nAraidi.
Approximate date - Death of St. Enda of Aran.

531 (or 537)
Maine mac Cearbhall, 1st King of Uí Maine, died 531 or 537.

534
 12 September or 30 December - Death of Bishop Ailbe of Emly (year varies according to sources; also given as 527, 528 or 542).

535
 Extreme weather events
 20 August - Death of St. Mochta of Louth (disciple of St. Patrick) (in 537 according to some sources).

536
 Extreme weather events causes Late Antique Little Ice Age
 Irish Annals record famine in Ireland.

537
 Late Antique Little Ice Age
 A plague strikes Britain and Ireland.

538
 Late Antique Little Ice Age
 Irish Annals records famine in Ireland.
 Death of missionary Manchan of Mohill.

539
 Late Antique Little Ice Age
 Irish Annals records famine in Ireland.

540s

540
 Birth of Columbanus at Nobber in the Kingdom of Meath.
 Approximate date - The Paschal controversy begins in Ireland.

542
 12 September or 30 December - Death of Bishop Ailbe of Emly (year varies according to sources; also given as 527, 528 or 534).

545
 Monastery founded at Clonmacnoise by St. Ciarán.

546
 Columba founds Derry.
 Approximate date - Death of Abbot Ciarán of Clonmacnoise (of yellow fever) (according to some sources - see 556 below).

549
Roman Catholic Diocese of Ossory, which still exists, founded.
Death of St. Finnian of Clonard, who founded Clonard Abbey.

550s
550
 Birth of Bishop Máedóc of Ferns (St. Áedan or Mogue) on Magh Slécht.

552
 Death of St. Finnian of Clonard, founder of Clonard Abbey.

556
 Death of Abbot Ciarán of Clonmacnoise (of yellow fever) (according to some sources - see 546 above).

557
 Death of the probably legendary Colmán Már mac Diarmato, a king of Uisnech in Mide of the Clann Cholmáin.

560s

563
 Columba founds a monastery on Iona off the coast of Scotland.
 Brendan founds a monastery at Clonfert.

570s

570
 Death of Laisrén mac Nad Froích (St. Molaise).

573
 Death of Abbot Brendan of Birr, one of the Twelve Apostles of Ireland.

575
 Convention of Druim Ceat, at which agreement is reached between the Uí Néill and the king of Dál Riata maintaining the peace and the balance of power. The poets are said to have been saved from banishment by the intervention of Columba.
 Bishop Muiredach of Killala meets with Columba in Ballysadare.

576
 Death of Colmán Már mac Coirpre, King of Leinster.

577
 Death of Brendan.
 Death of Coirpre Cromm mac Crimthainn, King of Munster from the Glendamnach sept of the Eoganachta. He is succeeded by Fergus Scandal mac Crimthainn.

580s

584
 The foundation of the University of Tuaim Drecain (Tomregan) by the Synod of Drumceat on Magh Slécht.

585
Suibne mac Colmáin becomes King of Uisnech in Mide of the Clann Cholmáin. He is the son of King Colmán Már mac Diarmato (died 557) and rules Uisnech until his death in 598.

588
Áed Dub mac Suibni (died c. 588) was an Irish king of the Cruthin of Dál nAraidi (in modern Ulster). He may have been king of the Ulaid.

590s

590
 Columbanus and twelve companions set sail for France.

593
 Death of Áed Dibchine mac Senaig  King of Leinster from the Uí Máil branch of the Laigin, the first king of this branch to hold the overlordship of Leinster.

595
Death of Saint Berach of Termonbarry

597
 9 June - Death of Columba, missionary monk, on Iona (born 521).

598
 Monastery established in Ferns, County Wexford, dedicated to Bishop Máedóc of Ferns (St. Áedan or Mogue).
 Suibne mac Colmáin, King of Uisnech in Mide of the Clann Cholmáin, is killed by his uncle Áed Sláine.

599–600
 Death of St. Cainnech at the abbey he founded at Aghaboe. His feast day is commemorated on 11 October in the Roman Catholic Church (Catholic Online) and on the 1 August or 14 August in the Eastern Orthodox Church.

600s
600
Death of Uatu mac Áedo a king of Connacht from the Uí Briúin branch of the Connachta.

References